Wulfenia carinthiaca, commonly known as wulfenia, is a plant in the plantain family. It is endemic to the Gartnerkofel mountain of the Carnic Alps at the Austria|Austro-Italian border. It was discovered in 1779 by Franz Xaver von Wulfen, for whom it is named.

It is cultivated as an  ornamental plant.

References

External links
See it at Botanic Garden Carinthia in Klagenfurt - Wulfenia carinthiaca

 Nature.jardin - Wulfenia carinthiaca

Plantaginaceae
Flora of the Alps
Flora of Austria
Flora of Italy
Garden plants of Europe
Taxa named by Nikolaus Joseph von Jacquin